Sovereign states and dependent territories in North America, in an inclusive definition, cover the landmass north of the Colombia-Panama border and include the islands of the Caribbean.

Sovereign states

All of the states listed here are member states of the United Nations.

Non-sovereign territories
This section contains areas that are not sovereign states but, also, are not integral parts of the sovereign states listed above. These include dependent territories and integral areas of primarily non-North American states.

Dependent territories
Dependencies that are not internationally recognized, or not in effect, are listed in italics.

Integral parts of primarily non-North American states

Disputed territories
Disputed territories that are not internationally recognized, or not in effect, are listed in italics:

See also
Flags of North America
List of currencies in the Americas
List of North American countries by GDP (nominal)
List of North American countries by GDP (nominal) per capita
List of North American countries by GDP (PPP)
List of North American countries by GDP (PPP) per capita
List of predecessors of sovereign states in North America
List of sovereign states and dependent territories in South America
List of sovereign states and dependent territories in the Americas

Notes

References

 

 
North America-related lists
North America
Lists of countries in the Americas
North America